The 1996 Indiana Hoosiers football team represented Indiana University Bloomington as a member of the Big Ten Conference during the 1996 NCAA Division I-A football season. Led by Bill Mallory in his 13th and final season as head coach, the Hoosiers compiled an overall record of 3–8 with a mark of 1–7 in conference play, placing in a three-way tie for ninth in the Big Ten. The team played home games at Memorial Stadium in Bloomington, Indiana.

Mallory was fired after the end of the season.

Schedule

Roster

1997 NFL draftees

References

Indiana
Indiana Hoosiers football seasons
Indiana Hoosiers football